Constanza Oriani (born 14 April 1962) is an Argentine fencer. She competed in the women's team foil event at the 1984 Summer Olympics.

References

External links
 

1962 births
Living people
Argentine female foil fencers
Olympic fencers of Argentina
Fencers at the 1984 Summer Olympics
Pan American Games medalists in fencing
Pan American Games bronze medalists for Argentina
Fencers at the 1983 Pan American Games
20th-century Argentine women